Steven Bonnar (born 27 August 1981) is a Scottish National Party politician who has served as Member of Parliament (MP) for Coatbridge, Chryston and Bellshill since 2019.

Raised in North Lanarkshire, Bonnar served as an SNP councillor in the Thorniewood ward of North Lanarkshire from 2015 to 2020. He defeated the incumbent Labour MP Hugh Gaffney at the 2019 general election. He later resigned from his councillor role.

Political career 
Following the 2014 Scottish independence referendum, Bonnar decided to run to be a councillor in his local ward of Thorniewood. The previous SNP councillor, Duncan McShannon, had become ill and had to vacate the seat after several months of sickness. On 9 July 2015, Bonnar won the by-election and was duly elected to serve as councillor for Thorniewood ward for North Lanarkshire Council. On 4 May 2017, Bonnar was again elected. During his time as a councillor, Bonnar was a witness for former SNP councillor Julie McAnulty in a successful defamation case in 2018, after she had been falsely accused by a party activist of making racist comments in a car trip with Bonnar. McAnulty was awarded £40,000 in damages.

Bonnar stood for election for the Scottish National Party to become MP for Coatbridge, Chryston and Bellshill at the 2019 general election. He became the third different MP in just over four years to represent the constituency, taking the seat from incumbent Labour MP Hugh Gaffney. Bonnar received 22,680 votes, with a majority of 5,624 to Gaffney's 17,056 votes. The seat was one of six in Scotland gained from Labour by the SNP during the election. When swearing in to the House of Commons, he crossed his fingers to protest having to affirm allegiance to the monarchy. In February 2020, Bonnar made the decision to step down from his councillor role at North Lanarkshire council to allow a by-election to be called in Thorniewood in May 2020, However, due to the COVID-19 pandemic, it was delayed until March 2021, having originally being scheduled for November 2020 (also due to COVID-19).

Controversies

In April 2020, a video emerged on a Rangers supporters Facebook group of Bonnar arguing with one of his neighbours. Bonnar had hung a Celtic F.C. towel across one of his windows on the day that Celtic were declared Scottish Premiership winners during the COVID-19 pandemic, and was confronted by a neighbour. In the video, the two engage in a verbal dispute. Bonnar responds angrily, escalating the confrontation. Scotland was under lockdown due to the pandemic, with Bonnar stopping a few metres away from his neighbour, which seemed to stop any further conflict. Bonnar later argued he was decorating during the working week and the flag was to cover the window for a short period of time, claiming that he was "drawn into" the confrontation. The SNP offered an official apology on Bonnar's behalf:

In May 2020, Police Scotland made further inquiries into the incident between Bonnar and his neighbour. On 14 May, they were both charged in connection with a street disturbance. A statement from Police Scotland stated it would be submitted to the Procurator Fiscal.

References

External links

 profile on SNP website
 

Living people
Scottish National Party MPs
UK MPs 2019–present
Scottish National Party councillors
Politicians from North Lanarkshire
Security guards
1981 births
Councillors in North Lanarkshire